Neuropeptide FF receptor 1, also known as NPFF1 is a human protein, encoded by the NPFFR1 gene.

See also
 Neuropeptide FF receptor

References

Further reading

External links

G protein-coupled receptors